QCB may refer to:

Qatar Central Bank, the central bank of Qatar
QCB, a radio operating signal noting particular causes of delayed responses
Qualifying corporate bond, a kind of loan note
Quantitative & Computational Biology, often conjoined as an academic discipline
Queen's Commendation for Bravery, UK military and civilian awards granted for bravery
Queen Charlotte Basin, a structural basin mostly beneath the continental shelf off of Western Canada
Queen City Balladeers, a non-profit folk music organization in Cincinnati, Ohio
Queensland Country Bank Stadium, a multi-purpose stadium in South Townsville, Queensland, Australia
Queer Campus Bangalore, a support group and safe space for queer youth in Bangalore, India
Quick change barrel, a style of modular firearm systems allowing rapid caliber or barrel replacement
Quick change body, a body/chassis switching system originally developed by Econ Engineering
Quidditch Club Boston, a US Quidditch team that won the 2016 US Quidditch Cup